Propanolamines are a class of chemical compounds, many of which are pharmaceutical drugs.  They are amino alcohols that are derivatives of 1-amino-2-propanol.

Propanolamines include: 

 Acebutolol
 Atenolol
 Betaxolol
 Bisoprolol
 Metoprolol
 Nadolol
 Penbutolol
 Phenylpropanolamine
 Pindolol
 Practolol
 Propranolol
 Ritodrine
 Timolol

See also
 Propanolamine

External links

References

Amino alcohols